Saint-Céneri-le-Gérei is a commune in the Orne department in north-western France.

History
The place is named for Serenicus (or Genericus), an Italian hermit who lived here during the 7th century. Known today as Saint Céneri, the Italian monk is reputed to have settled here after a long journey, when he experienced a miracle in answer to his prayer for water to quench his thirst. According to legend the so-called miraculous spring, located near the banks of the River Sarthe and today covered by a small stone shelter topped with a cross, sprang up in answer to his prayer. It came to be believed that water from the spring had the ability to cure eye problems.

When he died, a monastery was built, later destroyed by the Vikings in 903. The church was a dependency of the abbey of Saint-Evroult-en-Ouche.

The name le-Gérei comes from William Giroie, who built a castle here in 1044 of which only parts of the walls remain today. In 1060 the castle came under siege from Duke William II of Normandy (the future King William I of England) before being taken by Robert Curthose his son in 1088.

During the Hundred Years' War, Ambroise de Loré managed to defend the stronghold against the king of England Henry V and, then his brother John Plantagenet until 1434.

The beauty of the village's setting, in a wooded loop of the River Sarthe, has attracted and inspired many artists since the 19th century. Among the renowned painters who have been drawn to the village's beauty are Jean-Baptiste-Camille Corot, Gustave Courbet and Henri Harpignies. The popularity of the village was evidenced by the establishment of the Auberge des Sœurs Moisy, a hotel run by the Moisy sisters as an artists' retreat in the latter years of the 19th century. Today the inn on Rue de Dessous, which attracted Impressionist Painters for half a century between 1875 and 1908, is an art museum, the Auberge Des Souers Moisy Museum. The museum's most original feature is its celebrated Salle des Décapités, or Room of the Beheaded, which is decorated with an array of black, silhouetted heads drawn in profile.

Pierre Renard, son of artist Mary Renard, recalled the process by which the profiles of artists of the time were created: "At nightfall, the one whose profile we wanted to reproduce would stand next to the whitewashed wall; one of us held a candle at a distance so that the shadow cast was the size of the model. One of the painters, meanwhile, traced the outline of this shadow in charcoal, and the interior was painted in black. This is how, since then, I have been able to recognize, beyond the half-century which has unfortunately elapsed, the profiles of many artists and friends who are no longer. My child profile is there twice."

The village even has its own festival which annually celebrates those painters who came to, or lived in, Saint-Céneri-le-Gérei.

Geography 
Saint-Céneri-le-Gérei is situated in the Orne department of the region of Normandy, and is located in the beautiful Mancelles Alps in the heart of the Normandy-Maine Regional Nature Park. The boundary of Normandy and the neighbouring region of Pays de la Loire is marked by a large metal screw affixed in the stone railing of Saint-Céneri-le-Gérei's historic stone bridge spanning the Sarthe River. The area attracts nature enthusiasts and outdoor adventurers to its wooded hills, rocky cliffs, steep river valleys and patchwork of farmland meadows defined by hedgerows. Visitors are attracted to the nature park's beauty and also to activities such as hiking, horse riding, mountain biking, canoeing and kayaking, and fishing.  Visitors can climb to the summit of Mont de Avaloirs, which is the highest point in the region and commands far-reaching views despite being only 416 metres high. Saint-Céneri-le-Gérei  is also the starting point for a 10-kilometre walk that is outlined in information available at the village's tourist office.

Architecture 
The scenic village has many old stone houses along its winding lanes, and a four-arched historic stone bridge spans the River Sarthe. An 11th-century Romanesque church is perched high above the river and contains large frescoes. The frescoes were painted in the 12th and 14th century, but were plastered over in the 17th century. This is believed to have contributed to their preservation, because they were hidden for about 200 years before they were rediscovered.

A 15th-century medieval stone chapel whose original wooden incarnation is believed to have been built by Saint Céneri stands alone in a sprawling meadow near the Sarthe. Inside the chapel is a statue of Saint-Céneri to which various miracles have been attributed.

Economy
Saint-Céneri's economy is largely based on tourism, its status as one of Les Plus Beaux Villages de France ("France's Most Beautiful Villages") and its tranquil environment attracting many visitors to the village.

Transport

See also
Communes of the Orne department
Parc naturel régional Normandie-Maine

References

External links

 Saint-Céneri-le-Gérei website
 Photos

Communes of Orne
Plus Beaux Villages de France